Kees-Jan van der Klooster (born 3 July 1977) is a Paralympian athlete from Netherlands competing in alpine skiing events. In March 2001 he had a snowboard accident and broke his back. Since then he is paralysed from his waist down. His coach is Falco Teitsma.

He studied Marketing and Communication and is runnings his own business  K-J Projects Unlimited Abilities, a company working on a better lifestyle for disabled people. His nicknames are Sjees or Sjace.

Winter X Games
He is participating in the Winter X Games in the Monoski Cross. In 2007 and 2009 he won the bronze medal and in 2008 he won the Gold medal.

2010 Winter Paralympics
He competed in the 2010 Winter Paralympics in Vancouver, British Columbia, Canada.
He participated in the Men's Downhill – Sitting where he did not finish, the Men's Giant Slalom – Sitting where he became 17th and the Men's Super-G – Sitting where he became 23rd.

References

External links
 Kees-Jan van der Klooster's website
 International Paralympic Committee (IPC)
 Extremity games
 
 

1977 births
Living people
Dutch male alpine skiers
Paralympic alpine skiers of the Netherlands
Alpine skiers at the 2010 Winter Paralympics
Sportspeople from Vlissingen
X Games athletes
21st-century Dutch people